Dabaozi is a rural town in Chengbei District of Xining, Qinghai, China.

History
After the establishment of the Communist State in 1949, Dabaozi was under the jurisdiction of Huangzhong County. In 1956 it came under the jurisdiction of Xining, capital of northwest China's Qinghai province. In 1958 it was renamed "Dongfeng People's Commune". In 1984 it was incorporated as a township. In 1986 it was upgraded to a town.

Administrative division
As of 2017, the town is divided into 13 villages and two communities: 

Songjiazhai
Dabaozi
Jinjiawan
Taobei
Zhunan
Zhubei
Taonan
Yanxiao
Wangjiazhai
Yiqizhai
Wuzhong
Balang
Baojiazhai
Gongjuchang Community
Yijichuang Community

Geography
The Huangshui River passes through the town from west to east.

Education
The Xining No. 9 High School is located in the town.

Transportation
The G6 Beijing–Lhasa Expressway, G109 Xining-Huangzhong County Expressway and G045 Dandong-Lhasa Expressway pass through the town.

References

Xining
Township-level divisions of Qinghai